Western Express Highway, (Officially, Bisleri Western Express Highway )Abbreviated- Bisleri WEH, is a metro station on Line 1 of the Mumbai Metro serving the Andheri suburb of Mumbai, India. It is the flagship station of the line and was opened to the public on 8 June 2014.

History
In August 2016, MMOPL announced that WEH station would be rebranded as MagicBricks WEH Metro station, as part of a sponsorship deal.

Station layout

Facilities

List of food outlets available are: Monginis, Burger King, Jumbo King and Bisleri

Connections
The station is an interchange station between Lines 1 and 7 of the Metro with a foot over bridge facility.

Exits

See also
Public transport in Mumbai
List of Mumbai Metro stations
List of rapid transit systems in India
List of Metro Systems
Western Express Highway

References

External links

The official site of Mumbai Metro
 UrbanRail.Net – descriptions of all metro systems in the world, each with a schematic map showing all stations.

Mumbai Metro stations
Railway stations in India opened in 2014
2014 establishments in Maharashtra